Vostrovo is a rural locality (a selo) and the administrative center of Vostrovsky Selsoviet, Volchikhinsky District, Altai Krai, Russia. The population was 1,252 as of 2013. It was founded in 1806. There are 8 streets.

Geography 
Vostrovo is located 25 km northeast of Volchikha (the district's administrative centre) by road. Priborovoye is the nearest rural locality.

References 

Rural localities in Volchikhinsky District